Clarence James Griffith (April 9, 1877 – November 3, 1937) was an American football coach.  He served as the head football coach at Colorado Agricultural College—now known as Colorado State University from 1901 to 1902, compiling a record of 2–5–2.  A graduate of Iowa State University, Griffith was the assistant coach under George Toomey at Colorado Agricultural in 1900. When Toomey stepped down after the controversy of Joseph Dibble being a professional, Griffith took over as head coach for the remainder of the 1901 season. He also coached the Aggies in 1902 but resigned in 1903 after the birth of his first child, in Colorado.

Griffith died from heart failure at age of 60, in Oakley, Idaho, on November 3, 1937.

Head coaching record

References

External links
 

1877 births
1937 deaths
19th-century players of American football
Colorado State Rams football coaches
Iowa State Cyclones football players
People from Oakley, Idaho
People from Storm Lake, Iowa